Collier County is a county in the U.S. state of Florida. As of the 2020 census, the population was 375,752; an increase of 16.9% since the 2010 United States Census. Its county seat is  East Naples, where the county offices were moved from Everglades City in 1962.

Collier County comprises the Naples-Immokalee-Marco Island Metropolitan Statistical Area, which is included in the Cape Coral-Fort Myers-Naples Combined Statistical Area.

History
Archaeology at Platt Island in the Big Cypress National Preserve shows humans settled in what is now Collier County more than two thousand years ago. The Calusa people had an extensive presence in the area when Europeans arrived.

The county was created in 1923 from Lee County.  It was named for Barron Collier, a New York City advertising mogul and real estate developer who had moved to Southwest Florida and established himself as a prominent landowner.  He agreed to build the Tamiami Trail for what was then Lee County (comprising today's Collier, Hendry, and Lee Counties) in exchange for favorable consideration with the state legislature to have a county named for him. After Collier County was named, Collier was quoted as saying: "When I first came here on holiday with Juliet, I never expected that I would buy a whole region of it, nor did I expect to pay for the new Tamiami Trail, or half the things I've done. But I really didn't expect to have a whole county named after me."

Geography
It is the largest county in Florida by land area and fourth-largest by total area. Virtually the entire southeastern portion of the county lies within the Big Cypress National Preserve. The northernmost portion of Everglades National Park extends into the southern coastal part of the county. The total area of this county is nearly 1.5 times the size of Rhode Island, which is the smallest state, and is bigger than Rhode Island and Luxembourg combined.

Adjacent counties
Collier County is located at the southern end of Florida's Gulf Coast, and bounded by:
 Hendry County - north
 Broward County - east
 Miami-Dade County - southeast
 Monroe County - south
 Lee County - northwest

National protected areas
 Big Cypress National Preserve (part)
 Everglades National Park (part)
 Florida Panther National Wildlife Refuge
 Ten Thousand Islands National Wildlife Refuge

Transportation
 Everglades Airpark
 Immokalee Airport
 Marco Island Airport
 Naples Municipal Airport
 Dade-Collier Training and Transition Airport (mostly unused)

Major highways
   Interstate 75
  U.S. Route 41
  State Road 29
  State Road 84
  State Road 951

Demographics

2000 census
As of the census of 2000, there were 251,377 people, 102,973 households, and 71,257 families residing in the county. The population density was 124 people per square mile (48/km2). There were 144,536 housing units at an average density of 71 per square mile (28/km2).

, 86.06% of the population was White, 4.54% was Black or African American, 0.29% Native American, 0.62% Asian, 0.06% Pacific Islander, 6.19% from other races, and 2.23% from two or more races. Hispanic or Latino individuals (of any race) accounted for 19.61%. Languages spoken: 75.3% spoke English, 17.8% Spanish, 2.3% French Creole and 1.2% German as their first language.

In 2000 there were 102,973 households, out of which 22.70% had children under the age of 18 living with them, 58.10% were married couples living together, 7.20% had a female householder with no husband present, and 30.80% were non-families. 24.50% of all households were made up of individuals, and 11.90% had someone living alone who was 65 years of age or older. The average household size was 2.39 and the average family size was 2.79.

The county's population distribution by age was spread out but older than the U.S. as a whole, with 19.90% under the age of 18, 6.60% from 18 to 24, 24.60% from 25 to 44, 24.50% from 45 to 64, and 24.50% who were 65 years of age or older. The median age was 44.1 years. For every 100 females there were 100.30 males. For every 100 females age 18 and over, there were 99.20 males.

The median income for a household in the county was $48,289, and the median income for a family was $54,816. Males had a median income of $32,639 versus $26,371 for females. The per capita income for the county was $31,195. About 6.60% of families and 10.30% of the population were below the poverty line, including 16.20% of those under age 18 and 4.30% of those age 65 or over.

2010 census
The county continues to experience significant growth and is becoming increasingly diverse. As of the 2010 census, the county's population had increased to 321,520, an increase of 27.9% over the 2000 census. , the United States Census estimates the county's population at 332,427, an increase of 3.4% since the 2010 census. As of the 2010 census, 83.85% of the population was non-Hispanic whites, 25.9% was Latino or Hispanic, 6.6% was African-American and 1.1% was Asian. As of the 2010 census, the greatest source of population growth in the county since the 2000 census came from the Latino or Hispanic population which grew from 49,296 (19.6% of the total population) to 83,177 (25.9% of the total population). In terms of ancestry, 37.9% were English, 9.9% were Irish, 9.1% were "American", 3.2% were Italian and 3.1% were German.

2020 census

As of the 2020 United States census, there were 375,752 people, 140,578 households, and 97,279 families residing in the county.

Education
The county's public schools are operated by the District School Board of Collier County.

Public library
The Collier County Public Library system consists of ten locations servicing the entire county. All locations offer public internet stations, printing, photocopying, free Wi-Fi, and 24/7 dropboxes for book and video returns.

Politics

Voter registration
According to the Secretary of State's office, Republicans compose a majority of registered voters in Collier County. It is also one of the handful of counties where independents outnumber Democrats among registrants. The county is part of a long-established Republican stronghold in southwestern coastal Florida: the last Democrat to win the county being Adlai Stevenson II in 1952. The last Democratic Governor to carry the county was Reubin Askew in 1974 and the last Democratic Senator to do so was Bob Graham in 1992, six years later the county was one of four to back the Republican candidate, Charlie Crist.

Statewide elections

Communities

Cities
 Everglades City
 Marco Island
 Naples

Census-designated places

 Ave Maria
 Berkshire Lakes
 Chokoloskee
 Golden Gate
 Goodland
 Heritage Bay
 Immokalee
 Island Walk
 Lely
 Lely Resort
 Marco Shores-Hammock Bay
 Naples Manor
 Naples Park
 Orangetree
 Pelican Bay
 Pelican Marsh
 Pine Ridge
 Plantation Island
 Verona Walk
 Vineyards
 Winding Cypress

Community development districts
Fiddler's Creek District #1
Fiddler's Creek District #2

Other unincorporated communities

 Carnestown
 Copeland
 East Naples
 Isles of Capri
 Jerome
 Miles City
 North Naples
 Ochopee
 Vanderbilt Beach
 Vanderbilt Beach Estates

Invasive snake issues

Collier is located in the center of Florida's invasive snake epidemic. A three-month effort at the beginning of 2016 netted over one ton of captured snakes, including a Florida record for largest male Burmese python, measuring 16 feet and weighing 140 pounds.

See also

 Keewaydin Club
 National Register of Historic Places listings in Collier County, Florida
 Old Collier County Courthouse

References

External links

Government links/Constitutional offices
 Collier County official website / Board of County Commissioners official website
 Collier County Supervisor of Elections
 Collier County Property Appraiser
 Collier County Sheriff's Office
 Collier County Tax Collector
 Collier County Public Library

Special districts
 Collier County Public Schools
 South Florida Water Management District

Judicial branch
 Collier County Clerk of Courts
 Public Defender, 20th Judicial Circuit serving Charlotte, Collier, Glades, Hendry and Lee Counties
 Office of the State Attorney, 20th Judicial Circuit 
 Circuit and County Court for the 20th Judicial Circuit of Florida

Recycling Center
 The Naples Recycling Drop-Off Center is located north of the Naples Airport.

Tourism links
 Marco Island Living
 Naples Marco Island Everglades Convention and Visitors Bureau
 Naples Florida

 
1923 establishments in Florida
Florida counties
Populated places established in 1923